Renaissance (also titled Act I: Renaissance) is the seventh studio album by American singer Beyoncé, released on July 29, 2022, by Parkwood Entertainment and Columbia Records. Her first solo studio release since Lemonade (2016) and the first installment of a trilogy project, Beyoncé wrote and produced the album with Nova Wav, The-Dream, Symbolyc One, A. G. Cook, Honey Dijon, Beam, Tricky Stewart, BloodPop, Skrillex, Hit-Boy, No I.D., P2J and various others. Beam, Grace Jones and Tems appear as guest vocalists.

Beyoncé conceived and recorded Renaissance during the COVID-19 pandemic, seeking to inspire joy and escapism in listeners who had experienced isolation and to celebrate a club era in which marginalized people sought liberation through dance music. With its songs seamlessly arranged like a DJ mix, the album blends post-1970s Black dance music styles such as disco and house and pays homage to the Black and queer pioneers of those genres. The album's lyrical content explores themes of escapism, hedonism, self-assurance and self-expression.

Renaissance was a commercial success. It debuted at number one on the US Billboard 200 chart, Beyoncé's seventh consecutive album to do so, and is certified platinum. It also reached number one in Australia, Belgium, Canada, Denmark, France, Ireland, the Netherlands, New Zealand, Sweden, and the United Kingdom. The platinum-certified lead single "Break My Soul" was released on June 20, 2022, and reached number one on several charts worldwide, including the US Billboard Hot 100. The album's second single "Cuff It" peaked in the top ten on the Billboard Hot 100 and internationally. To support Renaissance, Beyoncé will embark on the all-stadium Renaissance World Tour, which is scheduled to commence in May 2023.

The album received universal acclaim from music critics for its eclectic yet cohesive sound, joyous mood, and Beyoncé's vocal performance. The most highly lauded album of 2022, it was named the best album of the year by publications including the Los Angeles Times, The New York Times, NPR, Pitchfork, and Rolling Stone and received nine nominations at the 65th Annual Grammy Awards, including Album of the Year, Song of the Year, and Record of the Year. Renaissance won four awards, making Beyoncé the most Grammy-awarded person in history, while its loss in the Album of the Year category was widely described as a "snub".

Background and conception 

In the latter half of the 2010s, Beyoncé released several critically acclaimed, narrative-driven projects that explored the legacies of Black musicians and artists, including 2016's Lemonade; her 2018, HBCU-inspired Coachella performance and the Netflix film and live album that documented it; and 2019's The Lion King soundtrack album The Gift and its visual companion, 2020's Black Is King.

Beyoncé told British Vogue that the lockdown due to the COVID-19 pandemic changed her as a person, stating that she has "spent a lot of time focusing on building my legacy and representing my culture the best way I know how. Now, I've decided to give myself permission to focus on my joy." Further, she called this period the most creative time in her life as she sought to escape feelings of isolation by recording new music. As lockdowns began to end, Beyoncé told Harper's Bazaar that "we are all ready to escape, travel, love, and laugh again. I feel a renaissance emerging, and I want to be part of nurturing that escape in any way possible."

Beyoncé sought inspiration in post-1970s Black dance music and club culture. Beyoncé noted that she was largely introduced to this culture by her "Uncle" Jonny, her gay cousin who helped raise her until his death during the AIDS epidemic. Further, she wanted the album to be a celebration of the underappreciated pioneers of dance music, whose contributions had been unrecognized in the mainstream.

Cover artwork 

On June 30, 2022, Beyoncé revealed the album's cover art, accompanied by a brief note, on her social media accounts. In the cover image, she is seated atop a "glowing", "holographic", "crystal horse" in a "futuristic, centipede-ish bikini". Critics interpreted the equestrian pose as an allusion both to John Collier's 1897 painting Lady Godiva and to photographs of Bianca Jagger riding a horse into Studio 54. Beyoncé's garment was designed by Nusi Quero and is reminiscent of the crystal top she wore on the 2003 Dangerously in Love cover.

An alternate cover image for the vinyl release features Beyoncé atop the same horse, but "wearing a white cowboy hat with a silver headpiece that hides her hair" and "sparkling silver chains that drape her arms and legs, as white, feathery poofs hang along the body of the horse".

Composition 

According to critics, Renaissance has an "innovative" and "playful" approach to genre, blending and shifting between several styles, primarily various genres of post-1970s black dance music. Described as a dance, house, disco, pop and R&B album, its songs incorporate elements of a wide variety of sub-genres, namely bounce, Detroit techno, garage, Afrobeats, boogie, funk, gospel, Miami bass, psychedelic soul, hip hop, trap, gqom, new jack swing, Jersey club, Chicago house, deep house, electro house, hip house, synth-pop, hyperpop, dancehall, and nu-disco.

The tracks are connected by seamless transitions facilitated by beatmatching, evoking a DJ mix. This reflects "the shifting moods and the physicality of the dance floor" rather than "the constraints of a radio station or a playlist", according to The New Yorker's Carrie Battan. Some tracks also have unconventional song structures, containing multiple tempos and movements.

Lyrically, Renaissance contains themes of escapism, self-assurance, self-expression, hedonism and pleasure, with Beyoncé inspiring joy and confidence in listeners. According to The Guardian, it "urg[es] listeners to wholeheartedly embrace pleasure", particularly referencing joy in Black culture. The album's lyrics emphasize dance as both a measure of personal catharsis and a liberating spiritual practice.

Beyoncé collaborated with, sampled and interpolated several progenitors of dance music on the album, including both mainstream and underground artists. This made the album a celebration of black and queer dance culture, with Vulture's Charlie Harding liking it to "a DJ set curated by house-music pioneers".

Promotion and release 
Beyoncé began to tease a new album on June7, 2022, by removing her profile picture from all of her social media platforms. Four days later, the text "What is a B7?" appeared on the homepage of the singer's official website. Fans noticed that the website also had placeholders for her upcoming seventh and eighth studio albums. Beyoncé officially announced the album and released the pre-sale for Renaissance on her website and digital streaming platforms the following day.

After first joining TikTok in December 2021, Beyoncé posted her first video, a compilation of people (including American rapper Cardi B) "dancing, vibing, and singing along" to Renaissances lead single, "Break My Soul", on July 14, 2022. Further, she made her entire catalog available for use on the platform, attracting significant media attention. Two days before the scheduled release, on July 27, the album arrived in retailers in France and eventually leaked onto the Internet.

The album was released on July 29, 2022. Upon the album's release, Beyoncé posted a note on her website revealing that Renaissance is the first part of a three-act project that she recorded over the past three years, during the COVID-19 pandemic.

Critics noted that Renaissance had a more conventional rollout than a number of Beyoncé’s previous albums, which were all surprise releases. The New York Times wrote that the album’s rollout reflected its throwback themes and music, with Beyoncé eschewing an exclusive digital release and instead releasing elaborate vinyl and CD packages. This ushered in a revival of CD sales, according to Billboard.

Singles 
On June 20, 2022, Beyoncé announced the album's lead single, "Break My Soul", would be released at midnight Eastern Time on June 21, to coincide with the 2022 summer solstice. The song appeared on music streaming service Tidal hours early, on June 20, and a lyric video was later released on YouTube. The song peaked atop the Billboard Hot 100, making it her twelfth total career chart topper (eighth as a solo artist) and her first solo song to do so since "Single Ladies (Put a Ring on It)" in 2008.

The album's second single, "Cuff It", was sent to radio in France on September 28, 2022, and impacted rhythmic and urban contemporary radio stations in the United States on October 4, 2022. The song peaked at number six on the Billboard Hot 100, making it the 21st song in her solo career to reach the top ten, and 31st overall.

Tour 
On February 1, 2023, Beyoncé announced the Renaissance World Tour via her Instagram account.

Visuals 
When Renaissance was first released, Beyoncé stated through a press release that she wanted fans to focus on the music, rather than any visual components, but confirmed that visuals were eventually forthcoming. On August 9, 2022, Beyoncé released a teaser video for the album's opening track, "I'm That Girl", that included a rapid montage of over twenty outfits that news outlets interpreted as previewing the various impending music videos for each track on the album.

Reception

Critics' reviews 

Renaissance was met with universal acclaim from music critics, many of whom praised its cohesive yet eclectic production, joyous nature, vocal performance, and celebration of post-1970s Black dance music. Renaissance is the most highly lauded album of 2022, topping many critics' year-end lists. On review aggregator Metacritic, Renaissance received a score of 91 out of 100 based on 26 reviews, indicating "universal acclaim". On review aggregator AnyDecentMusic?, the album has a rating of 8.6 out of 10 based on 25 reviews.

Veteran critic Robert Christgau hailed Renaissance as "the album of the year" and Beyoncé's "finest album", calling it unconventionally political, "erotically explicit, knowledgeable, and felt", with each song a "shrewdly differentiated pop smash". Characterizing it as a "modern classic" and Beyoncé's most impressive album, Exclaim!s Vernon Ayiku wrote that Renaissance is "the sound of a once-in-a-generation superstar performing at her peak". According to Kyle Denis of Billboard, Renaissance is an "absolutely stunning body of work", and perhaps Beyoncé's most innovative and experimental album with her "most nuanced vocal performances" to date. NPR's Ann Powers described it as "Beyoncé's Sistine Chapel", with its "stunning" design and detail, multifaceted nature and "timeless" impact.

Describing the album as "intergenerational musical exchange that landed like a cultural comet", Okayplayer's Robyn Mowatt praised Beyoncé's ability to bring together dance legends (such as Grace Jones and Nile Rogers) with contemporary underground musicians. The Line of Best Fit critic David Cobbald described the album as one of Beyoncé's best, noting that it is a departure from her previous work. Cobbald praised the album for celebrating "underappreciated architects" of disco, house and funk music. Music journalist Kate Solomon, writing for i, dubbed the album a "dazzling tribute to underground and underappreciated Black culture" and a dancefloor record aimed to heal "the pain and anguish" of the COVID-19 pandemic. Melissa Ruggieri described it "a danceteria devoted to hedonism, sex and most importantly self-worth" in USA Today.

Wesley Morris of The New York Times noted Beyoncé's "galactic" vocal performance, delivery and range. Mikael Wood of the Los Angeles Times called the album "the year's smartest record [and] also its most deep-feeling", praising its rhythms, harmonies and vocals. Pitchfork critic Julianne Escobedo Shepherd called it "a challenging, densely-referenced album" that forays into dance and club music more successfully than similar projects by Beyoncé's peers. Marcus Shorter of Consequence wrote that Renaissance is "damn close to perfect" with its "infectious and not overbearing, elegant, but not shallow" songs. John Amen, writing for PopMatters, complimented the album's contemporaneous production, dubbing it "a litany of samples, allusions, and tributes" but with "more style than substance" at times. Resident Advisor's Kiana Mickles praised Beyoncé's use of experimental production and genres on the album but wrote that it "falls flat" when Beyoncé references queer ballroom culture.

 Featured, sampled and interpolated artists 
Jamaican singer Grace Jones was featured on the track "Move"; Jones said how she does not usually collaborate with other artists, but agreed to work with Beyoncé because she is "a beautiful person, a beautiful talent" and she attends the same church as Jones' brother. American television personality Ts Madison, whose viral video clip "Bitch, I'm Black" is sampled on "Cozy", expressed gratitude to Beyoncé for allowing her to "let me use my voice" and "let it be known that we are all Black in totality" to a global audience. Other artists who expressed gratitude for being included on Renaissance include Robin S., whose 1990 house hit "Show Me Love" is credited on lead single "Break My Soul"; Kevin Aviance, whose song "Cunty" is sampled on "Pure/Honey"; and ballroom commentator Kevin JZ Prodigy, whose chants are borrowed from the 2009 DJ MikeQ track "Feels Like" on "Pure/Honey".

American singer and songwriter Kelis' 's 2003 single "Milkshake" was interpolated on "Energy". Beyoncé sought permission from Pharrell Williams and Chad Hugo of the Neptunes – the sole writers, producers, and rights owners of "Milkshake" – who subsequently cleared the interpolation. Kelis voiced anger about this, claiming that the Neptunes made her sign an exploitative contract and that she should have been notified of the song's use in advance. In response, the interpolation was removed from "Energy". British tabloid The Sun claimed that English pop duo Right Said Fred said that Beyoncé did not seek permission to interpolate their 1991 single "I'm Too Sexy" on "Alien Superstar". In response, Beyoncé's representative said that the accusation is false, with permission being sought on May 11, 2022, and granted on June 15, and the duo subsequently spoke of their gratitude for being on the album on social media.

The song "Heated" was met with criticism online for its use of the word "spaz" in its lyrics, which disability advocates said is an ableist slur. Other users online said that "spaz" has a different meaning in Black American English and is synonymous with "freaking out". Beyoncé announced the following day that the word would be removed from the song, with the word soon being replaced with "blast".

 Accolades 
At the end of 2022, Renaissance appeared atop a number of critics' lists ranking the year's top albums. According to Metacritic, it was the most prominently ranked record of 2022, and the album that was listed at number one by the most publications (25 publications). Renaissance was the most nominated album at the 65th Annual Grammy Awards, receiving nine including Album of the Year, Song of the Year and Record of the Year. This tied Beyoncé with Jay-Z as the most Grammy-nominated artist of all time. Her four wins made her the most awarded artist in Grammy history with 32 wins, surpassing the previous record of 31 that was held for 22 years by Hungarian-British conductor Georg Solti.
Awards

Year-end rankings

 Commercial performance 
Upon release, Renaissance garnered the record for the most single-day streams for an album by a female artist on Spotify in 2022, with over 43 million streams, which was later surpassed by Taylor Swift's Midnights. Within three months of its release, Renaissance amassed over 1 billion streams on Spotify. It was also the 17th best-selling album of the year according to the International Federation of the Phonographic Industry (IFPI).

 North America 
In the United States, Renaissance debuted at number one on the Billboard 200 chart, with 332,000 album-equivalent units—the second biggest 2022 album debut by a female artist and the third-biggest overall, after Taylor Swift's Midnights and Harry Styles's Harry's House. In doing so, Renaissance became Beyoncé's seventh consecutive album to debut at number one and the first album released by a woman in 2022 to reach number one. Already the only artist to have her first six albums all debut at number one, she became the first artist whose first seven albums did so as well.

Following its release, all tracks from Renaissance charted on the Billboard Hot 100 in the chart dated August 13, 2022. All 15 new tracks debuted inside the top 70 of the chart, while previously released lead single "Break My Soul" ascended to number one, making Renaissance Beyoncé's second album to chart all of its tracks simultaneously after Lemonade achieved the feat in 2016. Additionally, Renaissance became Beyoncé's first album since I Am... Sasha Fierce (2008) to achieve multiple top ten singles in the United States, with "Break My Soul" and "Cuff It" peaking at number 1 and 6 respectively.

Renaissance received 179.06 million streams in its first week, the eighth-biggest of the year overall, and the most of Beyoncé's career. In terms of traditional album sales, Renaissance posted the fourth-largest sales week for an album in 2022 with 190,000 albums sold. Additionally, the album sold 26,000 vinyl copies in its debut week.

Renaissance went on to spend its first 14 consecutive weeks within the top 10 of the Billboard 200. It returned to the Top 15 after a boost following the 2023 Grammy awards.

In Canada, Renaissance debuted at number one on the Canadian Albums Chart, becoming Beyoncé's third consecutive album to do so and her fourth number one album overall.

 Internationally 
By its second day of release, Renaissance was outselling the rest of the week's top five bestselling albums combined in the UK. The album debuted at number one on the UK Albums Chart, becoming Beyoncé fourth album to do so as a solo act, and her fifth including Destiny's Child. The album also debuted at number one on the Official Vinyl Albums Chart. In Ireland, Renaissance debuted atop the Irish Albums Chart, becoming Beyoncé's fifth number one album in the country. Simultaneously, "Break My Soul" also peaked at number one on the Irish Singles Chart, allowing Beyoncé to score an Irish Chart Double. In France, Renaissance debuted at number one on the SNEP albums chart, becoming Beyoncé's first number one album and her fourth top ten album in the country. Previously, 4 was Beyoncé's highest-charting album in the country, peaking at number two in 2011. Additionally, the album was the first album by a female artist to top the chart in 2022. In the Netherlands, the album landed atop the Album Top 100, becoming Beyoncé's third consecutive album to reach the summit in the country. The album has so far spent three non-consecutive weeks at number one, following its return to number one in its 11th week on the chart.

In Australia, the album debuted at number one on the Australian Albums Chart, becoming Beyoncé's third consecutive number-one album in the country after Beyoncé and Lemonade. Additionally, seven tracks from the album  debuted in the top 50.  It spent two consecutive weeks at number one, becoming her first album to do so since Beyoncé. Renaissance debuted at number one on the New Zealand Albums Chart, becoming Beyoncé's second consecutive number one album in the country following 2016's Lemonade, and her seventh top ten albums in the country overall.

 Impact 
Upon release, Renaissance sparked conversations and essays on the history of dance music and its roots in Black culture.

Several industry fellows reacted positively toward the release. American singer Crystal Waters, who helped make house music mainstream in the 1990s, said she was "ecstatic" when she heard Beyoncé's new music and expressed gratitude for how she is shining a light on underappreciated house singers. Chicago house DJ Ron Carroll described Renaissance as a "trailblazing" album that has reintroduced house music to the radio and encouraged other musicians to follow Beyoncé's lead. Aluna Francis of English electronic music duo AlunaGeorge lauded Renaissance for its impact on dance music and its Black creators. Francis explained that throughout her career, she had hoped and fought for the widespread recognition of Black musicians' place in dance music. Francis wrote that this revolution has now occurred following the release of Renaissance, with Beyoncé breaking stigmas and declaring that dance music is Black music, in turn encouraging listeners to reflect on the visibility and exploitation of Blackness within dance genres. Francis added that Renaissance could greatly benefit the investment and growth of communities around the world which allow Black dance music to thrive.

Other musicians also praised the album for its impact and musicology. British singer-songwriter Ellie Goulding said that her upcoming album Higher Than Heaven is a dance and house album in the same vein as Renaissance, with Beyoncé taking those genres globally. She later said that Renaissance restored her faith in pop music after the genre was heading in a bad direction. American singer SZA said that the album was the biggest risk a mainstream artist has taken in recent years. American musician Sufjan Stevens praised the production on the album, telling Stereogum: "The wizardry on that album is so awesome and frustrating for me as a musician because even if you took out her vocals, I'm still obsessed; I'm still intrigued by the engineering and production that's going on and the harmonic relationship between chords."

Beyoncé's mention of Telfar and Birkin bags in the closing track "Summer Renaissance" caused searches for both items to increase on Google Trends and multiple re-sale websites.

Considered by many music critics and journalists to be the favorite for Album of the Year at the 65th Annual Grammy Awards, Renaissances loss to Harry Styles's Harry's House was widely considered a "snub" or upset, with some critics ascribing Beyoncé's repeated losses in this category to the Recording Academy's overlooking or misunderstanding of Black female musicians and African American musical styles.

 Track listing Notes  indicates a co-producer
  indicates an additional producer

 Samples and interpolations 
Source: Billboard
 "I'm That Girl"
 contains elements of "Still Pimpin", written by Tommy Wright III and Andrea Summers and performed by Tommy Wright III & Princess Loko.
 "Cozy"
 contains an excerpt of "Bitch I'm Black" by Ts Madison
 contains a sample of "Get With U", written by Curtis Alan Jones and performed by Lidell Townsell & M.T.F
 contains a sample of "Unique", as performed by Danube Dance featuring Kim Cooper.
 "Alien Superstar"
 contains an interpolation of "I'm Too Sexy", written by Rob Manzoli, Richard Fairbrass, and Christopher Fairbrass and performed by Right Said Fred.
 contains a sample of "Moonraker", written by John Michael Cooper and performed by Foremost Poets
 contains a sample of Barbara Ann Teer's "Black Theatre" speech
 contains a sample of "Unique", written by Kim Cooper and Peter Rauhofer and performed by Danube Dance.
 "Cuff It"
 contains an interpolation of "Ooh La La La", written by Mary Brockert and Allen McGrier and performed by Teena Marie.
 "Energy"
 contains an interpolation of "Ooh La La La", written by Mary Brockert and Allen McGrier and performed by Teena Marie
 contains a sample of "Explode", written by Freddie Ross and Adam Piggot and performed by Big Freedia.
 contains an interpolation of "Milkshake", written by Pharrell Williams and Chad Hugo and performed by Kelis (later removed on digital and streaming versions).
 "Break My Soul"
 contains elements of "Show Me Love", written by Allen George and Fred McFarlane and performed by Robin S.
 contains a sample of "Explode", written by Freddie Ross and Adam Piggot and performed by Big Freedia.
 "Church Girl"
 contains a sample of "Center of Thy Will", written by Elbernita Clark and performed by The Clark Sisters.
 contains elements and interpolations of "Where They At", written by Jimi Payton, Dion Norman, and Derrick Ordogne and performed by DJ Jimi.
 contains elements and interpolations of "Think (About It)", written by James Brown and performed by Lyn Collins.
 contains elements of "Drag Rap (Triggerman)", written by Orville Hall and Phillip Price and performed by the Showboys.
 contains a sample of "Mister Magic" written by Ralph MacDonald and William Salter and performed by Grover Washington Jr.
 "America Has a Problem"
 contains a sample of "Cocaine", written by Tino McIntosh and Andrell Rogers and performed by Kilo Ali.
 "Pure/Honey"
 contains a sample of "Miss Honey", written by Andrew Richardson, Count Maurice, and Moi Renee and performed by Moi Renee.
 contains a sample of "Cunty (Wave Mix)", written by Eric Snead and Jerel Black and performed by Kevin Aviance.
 contains a sample of "Feels Like", written by Michael Cox and Kevin Bellmon and performed by MikeQ & Kevin Jz Prodigy.
 "Summer Renaissance"
 contains elements and interpolations of "I Feel Love" written by Donna Summer, Giorgio Moroder, and Pete Bellotte and performed by Donna Summer.

 Credits and personnel 
 Recording locations Atlanta, Georgia Sing Mastering (1–16)
 Tree Sound Studios (3, 16)Los Angeles, California Avenue A Studio West (1–16)
 Hardcover (13)
 Henson Recording Studios (6, 11)
 The Juicy Juicy (1–16)
 Kings Landing West (5, 8–12, 15–16)
 Nightbird Recording Studios (3)
 Parkwood West (1–16)
 Record Plant (2, 15)New York City, New York Trailer East Hampton (1, 3, 5–7, 11–12, 14)North Hollywood, California Blakeslee Studios (3,15)Ochi Rios, Jamaica Zak Starkey Studio (10)Westport, Connecticut'
 Le Crib (3)

Personnel 

 Beyoncé – vocals (all tracks), programming (tracks 1, 15), horn (15), vocal production
 Beam – vocals (4, 11), drums (5)
 Grace Jones – vocals (10)
 Tems – vocals (10)
 The-Dream – background vocals (1, 11), synthesizer (3, 4, 9), programming (7, 14), drums (13, 15)
 Kelman Duran – programming (1, 11)
 Stuart White – programming (1), drums (7, 11, 12, 15)
 Mike Dean – synthesizer (1–3, 13, 14, 16), drums (13), programming (16)
 Nija Charles – background vocals (2)
 Chris Penny – keyboards (2, 3), programming (2–4)
 Honey Dijon – programming (2–4)
 Luke Solomon – programming (2–4)
 Dave Giles – vocals (2)
 Blu June – background vocals (3, 15)
 Raphael Saadiq – bass, clavichord, drums, strings (4); horn (15)
 Nile Rodgers – guitar (4)
 Sheila E. – percussion (4)
 Daniel Crawford – piano (4)
 Scott Mayo – saxophone (4)
 Lemar Guillary – trombone (4)
 Jamella Adisa – trumpet (4)
 Al Cres – drums (5)
 Skrillex – drums (5)
 Nova Wav – synthesizer (5)
 Big Freedia – vocals (5, 6)
 The Samples – choir (6)
 Jason White – conductor (6)
 Caleb Curry – vocals (6)
 Danielle Withers – vocals (6)
 Jasmine Patton – vocals (6)
 Jorel Quinn – vocals (6)
 Kim Johnson – vocals (6)
 Kristen Lowe – vocals (6)
 Sabrina Claudio – background vocals (8)
 Patrick Paige II – bass (8)
 Derek Renfroe – guitar (8)
 Leven Kali – synthesizer (8), background vocals (9, 16)
 Annika Gesteedle-Diamant – background vocals (9)
 Ashlee Wingate – background vocals (9)
 Kye Young – background vocals (9)
 Laylani Gesteedle-Diamant – background vocals (9)
 Ari PenSmith – background vocals (10)
 Tatiana "Tatu" Matthews – background vocals (11)
 Calev – guitar (11)
 Cadenza – programming (11)
 Hit-Boy – programming (12)
 Lil Ju – programming (12)
 Jameil Aossey – drums (13)
 S1a0 – drums (13)
 BAH – programming (13)
 BloodPop – programming (13, 15), synthesizer (13)
 DIXSON – background vocals (15)
 Kenneth Whalum – saxophone (15)
 Lee Blaske – strings (15)
 Keyon Harrold – trumpet (15)
 Colin Leonard – mastering
 Stuart White – mixing, recording
 Andrea Roberts – engineering (all tracks), recording (11)
 John Cranfield – engineering
 Brandon Harding – recording (1, 2, 4–7)
 Chi Coney – recording (3–5, 11, 15, 16)
 Hotae Alexander Jang – recording (4, 15), engineering assistance (15)
 Russell Graham – recording (4)
 Steve Rusch – recording (4)
 Chris Mclaughlin – recording (6)
 Delroy "Phatta" Pottinger – recording (10)
 GuiltyBeatz – recording (10)
 Jabbar Stevens – recording (13)
 Matheus Braz – engineering assistance
 Mariel Gomerez - A&R
 Ricky Lawson - A&R/Project Manager

Charts

Weekly charts

Year-end charts

Certifications and sales

Release history

See also 
 List of Billboard 200 number-one albums of 2022
 List of number-one albums of 2022 (Australia)
 List of number-one albums of 2022 (Belgium)
 List of number-one albums of 2022 (Canada)
 List of number-one albums from the 2020s (Denmark)
 List of number-one hits of 2022 (France)
 List of number-one albums of 2022 (Ireland)
 List of number-one albums from the 2020s (New Zealand)
 List of number-one albums of 2022 (Scotland)
 List of number-one singles and albums in Sweden
 List of UK Albums Chart number ones of the 2020s

Notes

References 

2022 albums
Beyoncé albums
Columbia Records albums
Albums produced by Beyoncé
Dance music albums by American artists
Contemporary R&B albums by American artists
Pop albums by American artists
Albums produced by Boi-1da
Albums produced by Hit-Boy
Albums produced by No I.D.
Albums produced by Syd tha Kyd
Albums produced by The-Dream
Albums produced by Tricky Stewart
Albums produced by Skrillex
Albums produced by Symbolyc One
Albums produced by Mike Dean (record producer)
Albums produced by Morten Ristorp
Albums produced by Raphael Saadiq
Albums produced by GuiltyBeatz
Albums produced by A. G. Cook
Albums produced by BloodPop
Albums impacted by the COVID-19 pandemic
LGBT-related music
Albums produced by Beam
Grammy Award for Best Dance/Electronica Album